Kylie Presents Golden was a promotional tour by Australian recording artist Kylie Minogue, in support of her fourteenth studio album, Golden (2018). The tour comprised five shows in Europe and one show in North America.

Background

In contrast to Minogue's previous tours (with the exception of the Anti Tour), the singer conducted the tour as a short strip of concerts in small venues, performing to reduced crowds and in an intimate setting.

Speaking on the tour, Minogue stated: "I'm so excited to perform songs from my new album Golden in these iconic European clubs. Each of these venues is very special and—just as I found making the new album in Nashville to be so energising—these shows will be new, intimate and fun. I just can’t wait to bring these new songs to life and of course, throw in a few surprises for my fans."

In July 2018, Minogue announced an additional thirteen European concerts, which were planned to be a part of the promotional tour. These shows were scheduled to take place in November, consisting of her and her band "sharing the new album" with "a few surprises". However, in late September, Minogue announced that these dates would instead be part of the Golden Tour.

Setlist
The following setlist was obtained from the concert held on 13 March 2018, at Café de Paris in London, England. It does not represent all shows.
"Golden"
"One Last Kiss"
"Raining Glitter"
"Breathe"
"Put Yourself in My Place"
"Shelby '68"
"Radio On"
"Islands in the Stream" 
"The One"
"A Lifetime to Repair"
"Music's Too Sad Without You" 
"Hand on Your Heart"
"All the Lovers"
"Stop Me from Falling"
"Sincerely Yours"
"Dancing"

Notes
"Music's Too Sad Without You" was not performed in Manchester or New York City.
At the show in New York City, "Love at First Sight", "Slow" and "Your Disco Needs You" were performed.
"New York City", a then-unreleased song, was performed twice at the show on 25 June 2018.

Tour dates

Cancellations and rescheduled shows

References

2018 concert tours
Kylie Minogue concert tours